Charles Champagne may refer to:
Charles Champagne (MLA for Deux-Montagnes) (1838–1907), a member of the Legislative Assembly of Quebec for Deux-Montagnes electoral district, and later a member of the Legislative Council of Quebec
Charles Champagne (MLA for Hochelaga) (1849–1925), a member of the Legislative Assembly of Quebec for Hochelaga electoral district